The 1946 New Hampshire gubernatorial election was held on November 5, 1946. Incumbent Republican Charles M. Dale defeated Democratic nominee F. Clyde Keefe with 63.14% of the vote.

Primary elections
Primary elections were held on August 6, 1946.

Republican primary

Candidates
Charles M. Dale, incumbent Governor
Sherman Adams, U.S. Representative
Elmer E. Bussey

Results

General election

Candidates
Charles M. Dale, Republican
F. Clyde Keefe, Democratic

Results

References

1946
New Hampshire
Gubernatorial